The 2020 Supertaça Cândido de Oliveira was the 42nd edition of the Supertaça Cândido de Oliveira. It was played between the champions of the 2019–20 Primeira Liga and winners of the 2019–20 Taça de Portugal, Porto, and the runners-up of the Taça de Portugal, Benfica, on 23 December 2020. Porto won the match 2–0 to secure their second Supertaça title in three years and extend their record to 22 titles overall.

Effects of the COVID-19 pandemic
Due to the COVID-19 pandemic in Portugal, the FPF, Porto and Benfica announced on 1 July 2020 that this season's Supertaça would be suspended, providing a clearer schedule at the start of the season. A month later, on 5 August, the date of 23 December was decided for the match.

Venue

The Portuguese Football Federation announced on 16 October 2020 that the Estádio Municipal de Aveiro would host this season's Supertaça in December, as well as the postponed finals from the previous season's Taça de Portugal Feminina and Taça da Liga Feminina. This was the tenth time the Supertaça was played at the Estádio Municipal de Aveiro, having hosted all Supertaça matches but two since 2009, both of them played at Estádio Algarve, in 2015 and 2019.

Match

Details

Notes

References

Supertaça Cândido de Oliveira
FC Porto matches
S.L. Benfica matches
2020–21 in Portuguese football
Supertaça Cândido de Oliveira, 2020